The ABU TV Song Festival 2015 was the fourth annual edition of the ABU TV Song Festivals. The event, which is non-competitive, took place in Istanbul, Turkey and coinciding with the 52nd General Assembly of the Asia-Pacific Broadcasting Union (ABU) which was scheduled for 28 October 2015. Twelve countries have confirmed their participation.

Location

It was announced that the 2015 ABU TV Song Festival will take place in the Turkish city of Istanbul, and coincide with the 52nd General Assembly of the Asia-Pacific Broadcasting Union (ABU). Istanbul previously played hosts to the Eurovision Song Contest 2004, when the contest took place in the Abdi İpekçi Arena. For the 4th edition of ABU TV Song Festival, Istanbul Congress Center was selected to be the venue of the event.

Host broadcaster
Turkish Radio and Television Corporation (TRT) was the host broadcaster for the festival on 28 October 2015.

Format
The ABU TV Song Festival celebrates the popular music culture by showcasing high-profile musical acts from each of the participating ABU broadcasting members, in a non-competitive manner.

List of participants

Twelve countries have been announced as participating at the 2015 edition, with India and Kazakhstan making their début; Afghanistan and Malaysia returning after a one-year absence; whilst Australia, Brunei and China  have decided to withdraw from the festival.
Iran, Tunisia and Thailand were initially announced as participating at the 2015 edition, however they were withdrawn of the participating list for unknown reasons.

Withdrawn 
The following three countries withdrew their entries to the contest for a variety of reasons.

International broadcasts 
Each participating country was invited to broadcast the event across their respective networks and provide commentary in their native languages to add insight and description to the shows.

  – Ariana Television Network (ATN)
  – Television Broadcasts Limited (TVB)
  – Doordarshan (DD)
  – Televisi Republik Indonesia (TVRI)
  – Japanese Broadcasting Corporation (NHK)
  – Kazakhstan Radio and Television Corporation (KRTC)
  – Teledifusão de Macau (TDM)
  – Radio Television Malaysia (RTM)
  – Television Maldives (TVM)
  – Korean Broadcasting System (KBS)
  – Turkish Radio and Television Corporation (TRT)
  – Vietnam Television (VTV)

Other countries 
  – On 3 June, Special Broadcasting Service (SBS) confirmed that they would not participate in the 2015 edition.
  – On 25 June, Radio Televisyen Brunei (RTB) confirmed that they would not participate in the 2015 edition.
  – Television New Zealand (TVNZ) confirmed on 11 June 2015 that they have no intention to make their début in 2015.

Associate ABU members 
  – On 30 July 2015, AIST TV confirmed that they will not be making their début at the ABU TV Song Festival in Turkey.

See also 
 ABU Song Festivals
 ABU Radio Song Festival 2015
 Asia-Pacific Broadcasting Union
 Eurovision Song Contest 2015
 Eurovision Young Dancers 2015
 Junior Eurovision Song Contest 2015
 Turkvision Song Contest 2015
 Bala Turkvision Song Contest 2015

References

2015 in Istanbul
2015 song contests
ABU Song Festivals
Music festivals in Turkey